Mansura, referred to as Brahmanabad in later centuries, was the historic capital of the caliphal province of Sindh, during the eighth century under the Umayyad Caliphate and then Abbasid Caliphate from the year 750 AD to 1006 AD. The city was founded as a central garrison by the Umayyad Forces in Sindh, the city transformed into a very vibrant metropolis during the Abbasid Era surpassing the wealth of Multan in the north and Debal in the south.  Mansura was the first capital established by the Muslims in the Indian subcontinent after Muhammad bin Qasim seized the Brahmanabad territory. Mansura was built on the shores of the Indus River, it was surrounded by fertile farmland, Ibn Hauqal mentioned the wealthy local merchants who wore Baghdad Costume and were of Sindhi-Arab origins, houses were made of clay, baked bricks and plaster.

Mansura exported herbs and spices, textiles, ivory, metals and mirrors to Baghdad. There were some renowned educational institutions in the city, Mansura produced the first translation of the Quran in the Sindhi language, it was used widely throughout the Indus region. The city was the hometown of famous historical figures such as Abu Mashar Sindhi is described by many historians and chroniclers as a pioneer in the compilation of Hadith; Abu Raja Sindhi lived in Baghdad and engaged in scientific and literary pursuits they translated a large number of ancient books of South Asia on mathematics, astronomy, astrology, medicine, literature and ethics into Arabic.
According to geologists an earthquake struck both Debal and Mansura in the year 893.AD, the city was later ruled by the Soomro Emirs. Mansura was sacked by the forces of Mahmud of Ghazni because the inhabitants feared his reputation and refused to open the gates. The city never recovered and its Soomro Emirs were deposed.

History
This city was a capital of Lohana dynasty. There was a powerful king named Agham Lohana who ruled this city before Chach of Aror invaded the area and defeated Lohanas and made under his sway.

Erstwhile name of this city was Brahmanabad, which was renamed as Mansura by the Arab Conquerors. The Umayyad governor of Sind, Al-Hakam, founded a city called al-Mahfuza later called Brahminabad. Historical sources state that he found there were "no places in Sind where Muslims were safe", which indicates there were unrest and rebellions before his arrival. His deputy Al-Thaqafi founded Al-Masura "opposite Al-Mahfuza". Historian Blankship believes that the former was a base for the Yamani troops of the Caliphate and the latter was for the Mudari troops. By the time of Al-Baladhuri, the old Brahamanabad was in ruins, and the new city itself was referred to by the name Brahmanabad.

The city was further developed by Khalid ibn Barmak (705–782), a member of the Iranian Barmakids family, during the Abbasid Caliphate. The city holds an important position in Muslim history as the first to be built by Arabs according to the principles of town-planning. Seventeen years later, lessons learned in Mansura were applied in Baghdad  where there were once numerous Sindhi inspired buildings and monuments.

Mansura's history began under the Umayyad Caliphs, when Muslim Arabs attempted to conquer the frontier kingdoms of India, Kabul, Zabul, and Sindh. In the early 8th Century, with the Kingdom of Sindh convulsed by internal strife, the Arabs seized their chance and renewed their attacks. Thereafter it was captured by Muhammad ibn Qasim, nephew of al-Hajjaj ibn Yusuf, the governor of Iraq and Khurasan with the army. Qasim's successors attempted to expand from Sindh into the Punjab and other regions. Al-Masudi ascribed the foundation of the city to Governor Mansur ibn Jamhur, the last Umayyad governor of Sindh. Umar ibn Abd al-Aziz, who belonged to the Banu Habar tribe, the clan of Banu Asad, was the first governor of al-Mansura. Under the Caliphate of al-Mansur, Khalid was appointed governor of Fars and, after helping obtain Prince Isa ibn Musa's renunciation of his succession to the caliphate in 765, became governor of Tabaristan. Around the same time, his son Yahya ibn Khalid, was appointed governor of Adharbayjan.

According to historians, Mansura was a beautiful town with vast orchards of mangoes and groves of date palms. Today the ruins of Mansura are spread over an area  in circumference near the modern city of Shahdadpur. The most significant ruin found in Mansura is the large courtyard of a Jamia Masjid (mosque).

Modern ruins
The city lies upon the open sandy plain amongst rolling heaps of brick debris, crisscrossed with the depressions of its original streets and surrounded by the ruins of its once massive walls and bastions. Apart from a considerable area towards the south-east end, the whole space is covered with billowing mounds of brick ruins. Nothing now stands above the surface, except in one place, where an unrecognizable tower-like core of brick masonry remains. There is a total absence of stone masonry of any kind, but lumps of charred wood dotted here and there indicate the former presence of woodwork. The cement used in the brickwork appears to have been mud which forms the greater mass of the present mounds.
As per historian Rahimdad Khan Molai Shedai,"Brahmanabad town was located within 4 miles area, where in the temple named Nu Wihar there was an idol of Buddha. In various history books on Sindh said temple was also written as Nu Bahar which is varied form of Nu Wihar. As Byblion temple priests were astrologers or fortune tellers like priests of Brahmanabad were also great astrologers. The staunch Brahaman king like Chach had to kneel before them and constrained to renovate the temple. The number of the priests in the town was around 1000'.

In the initial excavation of the urban complex of Brahmanabad-Mansurah-Mahfuzah, A. P. Bellasis uncovered a seal bearing the Arabic inscription "Imam al-Baqir" which appear to belong to the fifth Shi'ite Imam Muhammad al-Baqir (677–733 AD).

See also

 Jam Nawaz Ali
 Chach Nama
 Agham Lohana
 Lohana
 Samma Dynasty
 Khafif
 Debal
 Multan
 Abbasid Era
 Abu Mashar Sindhi
 Abu Raja Sindhi
 Ibn Hauqal
 Soomro Dynasty

References

Bibliography

Further reading
 Avari, B. (2012). Islamic civilization in South Asia: A history of Muslim power and presence in the Indian subcontinent. London: Routledge.
 Rashid, N. (1998). Al-Mansurah-The Lost City. Journal of the Pakistan Historical Society 46(4).
 Mansura Archaeological Site Photo
 Sindh Archaeology

Former populated places in Pakistan
History of Pakistan
History of Sindh
Chach Nama
Abbasid Caliphate
8th-century establishments in the Umayyad Caliphate